Island House may refer to the following structures:

United Kingdom
Derwent Island House, Derwent Water, Keswick, Cumbria
Island House, Belle Isle in Windermere
Island House, Birmingham, West Midlands
Island House, Laugharne,  Grade II* listed, partly Tudor, sub-medieval town house located in Laugharne, Carmarthenshire
Island House, Barbican, a Grade II listed building in Plymouth, Devon
Island House, Plympton, a Grade II listed building in Plymouth, Devon

Other places
Island House, Hong Kong
The Island House, Elk Rapids, Michigan, U.S.

See also
House Island (disambiguation)